Italian basketball clubs in European and worldwide competitions is the performance record of men's professional basketball clubs from Italy's top-tier level league, the Lega Basket Serie A, in international competitions.

History
Italian men's professional basketball clubs have played in European-wide basketball competitions since 1958, when Simmenthal Milano took part in the FIBA European Champions Cup (now called EuroLeague). Simmenthal Milano was also the first Italian men's basketball club that won a European-wide competition trophy, the FIBA European Champions Cup (EuroLeague), in 1966, when the club beat Slavia VŠ Praha in the Finals that took place in Bologna, Italy. For the next four decades, Italian basketball club teams dominated in European basketball, winning many cups in all European-wide competitions. Overall, 38 different Italian men's basketball clubs have played in pan-European competitions.

The finals

Italian clubs in EuroLeague (1st-tier level)

Season to season

Italian clubs in FIBA Saporta Cup (2nd-tier level)

Season to season

Italian clubs in FIBA Korać Cup (3rd-tier level)

Season to season

See also 
European basketball clubs in European and worldwide competitions:
 Croatia
 Czechoslovakia
 France
 Greece
 Israel
 Russia
 Spain
 Turkey
 USSR
 Yugoslavia

Basketball in Italy
Lega Basket Serie A